John Roberts joined the United States Court of Appeals for the District of Columbia Circuit in 2003, succeeding James L. Buckley. The following are opinions written by Judge Roberts in 2003.

References

Case law lists by judge